Mušvete is a village in the municipality of Čajetina, western Serbia. As of the 2011 census, the village has a population of 242 people.

References

Populated places in Zlatibor District